Yang Jai-Hua (born 1937, also known as Yang Ruihua), is a male former international table tennis player from China.

Table tennis career
He won two bronze medals at the 1956 World Table Tennis Championships and the 1959 World Table Tennis Championships in the Swaythling Cup (men's team event) for China.

See also
 List of table tennis players
 List of World Table Tennis Championships medalists

References

Chinese male table tennis players
Table tennis players from Shanghai
1937 births
Living people
World Table Tennis Championships medalists